Cosmopterix fulminella is a moth in the family Cosmopterigidae. It was described by Stringer in 1930. It is found in Japan.

References

Natural History Museum Lepidoptera generic names catalog

Moths described in 1930
fulminella